Marion Worth (born Mary Ann Ward; July 4, 1930 – December 19, 1999) was an American country music singer. She was a popular performer on the Grand Ole Opry in Nashville, Tennessee. She also had several hits in the early 1960s.

Early life 
Marion Worth was born in 1930 during the height of the depression. Her father, a railroad worker, taught her how to play piano. At the age of 10, she won a local talent show contest for five weeks straight. Initially, she was not interested in pursuing a career in the music business, wanting to become a nurse instead. Worth attended the Paul Hayne School, where she began her medical training. Worth accepted a job as a bookkeeper for a record company around the time she and her sister won another local talent contest. These events encouraged Worth to pursue a career in the music business.

She made her radio debut on Dallas, Texas station KLIF. She then returned to Birmingham, Alabama and worked at radio stations WVOK and WAPI, and also appeared on WAPI-TV. She met established singer/songwriter Happy Wilson who became quite impressed with Marion's singing and began recording her.

Musical career 
In 1959, Worth had her first hit, called "Are You Willing, Willie," on Cherokee Records. The song peaked in the top 15 of the country music charts. In 1960, her song "That's My Kind of Love" went to the top 5, becoming her biggest hit. Jack Stapp signed the young singer to the Grand Ole Opry'''s Friday Night Frollic. As a result of her independent record label hits, she was signed to Columbia Records where she was produced by Don Law and Frank Jones. At Columbia, she recorded a single called "I Think I Know". The song was a Top 10 hit for Worth. In 1961, she released another single called "There'll Always Be Sadness". The single was not as successful as her other singles, but it did make the Top 25 that year. For almost two years, Worth was absent from the Country charts.

In 1963, Marion returned to the Country charts. That year, she recorded the song "Shake Me I Rattle (Squeeze Me I Cry)" which reached Country's Top 15 and crossed over to the Pop Music charts,  reaching the Top 50. It was also played on Easy Listening stations, and receives some airplay as a Christmas song due to its theme of toys and giving. She followed up well with a cover version of "Crazy Arms," a hit for Ray Price. Her version reached the Country Top 20. That same year, Worth joined the Grand Ole Opry. The next year, 1964 started with a Top 40 hit called "You Took Him Off My Hands (Now Please Take Him Off My Mind)". Her biggest hit of 1964 was a duet recording with George Morgan called "Slipping Around". The song was a Top 20 hit. She had another recording that year called "The French Song", which was a Top 25 hit.

In 1966, Worth was back on the charts with a top 40 recording called "I Will Not Blow Out the Light". Marion soon parted ways with Columbia Records and signed with Decca Records where she recorded two songs that reached the charts, "A Woman Needs Love" in 1967 and "Mama Sez" in 1968.

 Later years and death 
Worth's recording success on the Country Music charts waned after 1968.  Her hobby was to study the history of the world, which she focused a lot of time on after her chart success faded away. However, Worth didn't stop performing. She continued to be an active member of the Grand Ole Opry'' and she was a popular and in-demand performer for many years in the United States and Canada.

Worth did a lot of firsts for Country Music during her heyday. She was one of the first Country performers to perform at Carnegie Hall in New York City, as well as one of the first Country performers to perform in Las Vegas. During the 1950s, Worth was one of several female Country singers, which included Loretta Lynn and Kitty Wells, to break down the tradition of using women only as background singers in country music.

On Sunday, December 19, 1999, Worth died in Nashville, Tennessee at the Tennessee Christian Medical Center from complications of emphysema. She was 69 years old.

Discography

Albums

Singles

External links
 Marion Worth Dies At Age 64

1930 births
1999 deaths
American women country singers
American country singer-songwriters
Grand Ole Opry members
Musicians from Birmingham, Alabama
Columbia Records artists
20th-century American singers
20th-century American women singers
Country musicians from Alabama
Singer-songwriters from Alabama